Uridium 2 is a 1993 science fiction side-scrolling shoot 'em up originally designed by Andrew Braybrook for the Amiga. It is the sequel to Braybrook's earlier Commodore 64 game Uridium. Braybrook kept a diary of the game's development in late 1992, which was published in the British computer magazine The One.

Gameplay
Uridium 2 retains the same setting and gameplay of the original Uridium, but the presentation is highly improved, thanks to the Amiga's better graphics and sound capabilities. The sprites and background objects are more detailed and more colourful, the game scrolls vertically as well as horizontally, and the sound includes a souped-up version of the original Uridium theme tune, as well as PCM sampled speech announcing important in-game events.

Gameplay improvements include a simultaneous two-player mode, power-ups left behind by shooting enemies, a radar screen at the bottom of the game screen, and an improved mini-game when the player reaches the dreadnought's reactor core: instead of a simple quick-draw test to disarm the reactor, the player now gets to actually shoot at the reactor core using a drone pilot. In addition, the play area is greatly increased due to the larger size of the dreadnoughts and the addition of vertical scrolling.

References

External links

1993 video games
Horizontally scrolling shooters
Science fiction video games
Video games developed in the United Kingdom
Amiga games
Amiga-only games

Multiplayer and single-player video games